Babble was an online magazine and blog network targeting young, educated, urban parents. Their site operated a large network of parent blogs, employing many bloggers on the subjects of parenting and child-raising.

In early 2019, it was announced that Babble had been shut down.

History
Babble was launched in December 2006 by co-founders Rufus Griscom and Alisa Volkman. After one year, the site grew to half a million readers per month. Babble Media became an independent company in 2009, and was acquired by Disney Interactive Media Group in 2011.

Reception
The American Society of Magazine Editors (ASME) shortlisted Babble for its 2008 "General Excellence Online" award, writing that the "magazine skillfully combines in-depth reporting, thoughtful journalism, a dazzling variety of blog voices and visually arresting, interactive digital features. The result is a smart, hip and endlessly entertaining website that has revolutionized the parenting field."

Time magazine listed Babble.com as one of the 50 Best Websites of 2010, while Forbes named Babble as one of the Top 100 Websites for Women.

Babble advertising and sponsorship policies came under fire in 2010 and 2011 after several parenting authors and bloggers noted their breastfeeding guide was sponsored by Similac maker Mead Johnson.

References

External links
 Babble.com
 Top 100 Mom Blogs
 Latin America Babble

Disney Interactive
Magazines established in 2006
Magazines disestablished in 2019
Online magazines published in the United States
Parenting magazines
Spanish-language magazines